The NHK Trophy is an international, senior-level figure skating competition held as part of the ISU Grand Prix of Figure Skating series. Organized by the Japanese Skating Federation, it began in 1979 and was added to the Grand Prix series in 1995, the series' inaugural year. Medals are awarded in the disciplines of men's singles, ladies' singles, pair skating, and ice dancing.

Medalists

Men

Ladies

Pairs

Ice dancing

References

External links

 Results of NHK Trophy since 1979 on the-sport.org
 2006 NHK Trophy - Official site

 
ISU Grand Prix of Figure Skating
Trophy
International figure skating competitions hosted by Japan
Recurring sporting events established in 1979
1979 establishments in Japan